This is a list of seasons completed by the Penn State Nittany Lions men's ice hockey team. The list documents the season-by-season records of the Nittany Lions from 1940 to present, including conference and national post season records.

Season-by-season results.

Varsity Sport

* Winning percentage is used when conference schedules are unbalanced.

Club Sport

Footnotes

References

 
Lists of college men's ice hockey seasons in the United States
Penn State Nittany Lions ice hockey seasons